Objects of Desire is a jazz vocal album by Michael Franks, released in 1982 with Warner Bros. Records. It was Franks' seventh studio album.

Track listing

Charts

Personnel

Musicians
Michael Franks - vocals, backing vocals (2, 5, 8) 
Bonnie Raitt - vocals and backing vocals (2)
S. Renee Diggs - backing vocals (1, 5, 8), vocals (8)
Yvonne Lewis - backing vocals (1)
Ullanda McCullough - backing vocals (1, 5) 
Kasey Cisyk - backing vocals (5)
Leslie Miller - backing vocals (5)
Luther Vandross - backing vocals (7)
Phil Ballou - backing vocals (7)
Tawatha Agee   - backing vocals (7)
Randy Vanwarmer - backing vocals (6)
Francisco Centeno - bass (1, 7, 8)
Mark Egan - bass (4, 5, 9)
Neil Jason - bass (2, 3, 6)
Rick Cutler - drums (4)
Harvey Mason - drums (8)
Andy Newmark - drums (2, 3, 5, 6)
Buddy Williams - drums (1, 7, 9)
Rob Mounsey - electric piano  (1, 4, 7-9), OB-Xa (1, 2, 5), Prophet 5 (2, 5, 7), acoustic piano (8)
Ted Lo - fender rhodes (3, 5)
Randy Brecker - trumpet (1, 7), flugelhorn (4)
Lew Soloff - trumpet (1, 7), flugelhorn (4)
Larry Carlton - electric guitar solo (3)
Joe Caro - electric guitar (4, 9)
Steve Khan - classical guitar (9)
Hugh McCracken - electric guitar (8)
Nick Moroch - electric guitar (1-3, 6, 7), acoustic guitar (6)
Ray Bardani - rhythm tech tambourine (7,8)
Rubens Bassini - percussion (4, 9), congas (9)
Victor Feldman - percussion (3, 8)
Bette Sussman - fender rhodes (2)
Lawrence Feldman - alto saxophone (1, 4, 7), tenor saxophone solo (7), flute (9)
David Sanborn - alto saxophone solo (6, 8)
Michael Brecker - tenor saxophone (1, 4, 7)
Michael Colina - Arp (2, 9), OB-Xa (3, 4, 6, 8), moog bass (5), antique cymbals (6)
Jill Jaffee and City Strings - strings (8)

Support
Arrangement – Michael Colina, Rob Mounsey, Michael Franks
Mastering – George Marino
Producers – Ray Bardani, Michael Colina

References

Michael Franks (musician) albums
1982 albums
Albums produced by Michael Colina
Warner Records albums